Mbara is an endangered Chadic (Biu–Mandara) language of Chad.

References

Biu-Mandara languages